Manly Wharf is a heritage-listed passenger terminal wharf and recreational area located at West Esplanade and serving Manly, a Sydney suburb in the Northern Beaches Council local government area of New South Wales, Australia. Since the 1850s, it has served as the Manly embarkation and disembarkation point for the Manly to Sydney ferry service.

The wharf has been redeveloped a number of times since the first structure was constructed in 1856. New facilities were added in the early 20th century, and it was rebuilt in a modernist style in the early 1940s, the basic form of which remains today. The wharf was added to the New South Wales State Heritage Register on 18 April 2000.

In addition to passenger services, a cargo service was also run to Manly until the 1928-opening of the Spit Bridge. Following the closure of the cargo service, an amusement park, Manly Fun Pier, was opened on the east wharf in 1931 which closed prior to the 1990 redevelopment of the wharf.

Services

To the south west of the main wharf is the Manly Hotel Wharf also known as the East Wharf, which from a transport perspective is regarded as part of Manly Wharf. Services from that wharf are shown as operating from platform 3 in the services below.

The main wharf is served by Sydney Ferries and Manly Fast Ferry services to and from Circular Quay. The Hotel Wharf is served by Captain Cook Cruises and other My Fast Ferry services around Sydney Harbour.

Interchanges
Keolis Downer Northern Beaches operate services from The Esplanade and Belgrave Street. In the 1980s, a bus interchange was built outside the wharf. It was demolished when the wharf was redeveloped and the stops moved further away.

History 

The first wharf was constructed in 1856 on the same site as the present wharf. Lumby (2016) says the date was 1855, and the wharf built by English-born merchant and Manly enthusiast, Henry Gilbert Smith, who envisaged the place as a seaside resort. Smith bought up land in 1853 and eventually acquired an interest in steam ferries serving the locality. As well as building a house known as "Fairlight", Smith was responsible for cottages, a hotel, church, school, pleasure grounds and swimming baths. He also had much to do with planting the first Norfolk Island pines (Araucaria heterophylla) on the ocean front.

Prior to the construction of the first Spit Bridge in 1928, retired passenger ferries were used as cargo carriers. Following the closure of the cargo service, an amusement park, Manly Fun Pier, was opened on the east wharf. The amusement park closed in 1989 and the two wharf structures were redeveloped in 1990.

Improvements were made to the wharf in the first half of the 20th century. These were swept away at the end of the inter-war era after the Maritime Services Board decided to construct an "imposing" new wharf during 1938 following several years of local agitation. A fire at the wharf in 1939 precipitated further action.

The Maritime Services Board engaged gifted young modernist architect Arthur Baldwinson (1908–68), not long after his return from several years working in England, to design major reconstructions of the ferry wharves at Manly and Circular Quay.

The wharf was built in a modernistic transport idiom with typical stylistic features of era such as play of circular and rectangular geometric terms, bayed facade to the water (marine connotations), wide arc plan at entrance, clock tower with "fins," flat roofing marked by wide fascia board. The current entrance was originally designed as a tram terminus and turning area. The structure was subjected to major alterations to the wharf wings involving a T-shaped clerestorey. The works were completed in 1941.

Until the mid-1960s, ferries docked at both sides of the wharf. When the Port Jackson & Manly Steamship Company introduced hydrofoils to the Manly service in the mid-1960s, a pontoon was attached to the eastern side to allow the hydrofoils to berth without their foils fouling the wharf. This was removed when the hydrofoils were replaced by JetCats in 1991. When the Freshwater class ferries were introduced in the 1980s, the western berth was rebuilt to accommodate their onboard gangways.

The wharf complex has a number of retail outlets and restaurants. In 2014, plans were lodged to add a second storey to the wharf.

The wharf was added to the New South Wales State Heritage Register on 18 April 2000.

Description 
A broad wharf supported on timber piers and with a concrete platform. The superstructure is constructed of steel and timber. The facade and side walls form an important architectural design, similar to the Circular Quay ferry terminals.

The original part of the wharf was built in a modernistic transport idiom, with typical stylistic features of era including play of circular and rectangular geometric terms, bayed facade to the water (marine connotations), wide arc plan at entrance, clock tower with "fins", flat roofing marked by wide fascia board. The current entrance was originally designed as a tram terminus and turning area. Timber clad framed structure opening and large internal spaces, concrete deck to west enclosed by "ship" railing. Some original shop fittings, signage etc. Subjected to major alterations to the wharf wings involving a T-shaped clerestorey.

Modifications and dates 
Additions to the wharf include the hydrofoil pontoon , and the more recent elevated platforms for new ferries.

Extensive refurbishment in 1990.

Heritage listing 
As at 11 April 2001, the wharf was considered of environmental significance as a visually prominent man-made feature; and of historical significance for its associations with the maritime activities at Manly as a tourist destination and suburb of Sydney, dependent on the ferry link to the CBD.

Together with Circular Quay, the wharf is the only substantial older style ferry wharf surviving in Port Jackson: association with Manly's history as a recreational centre.

Manly Wharf was listed on the New South Wales State Heritage Register on 18 April 2000 having satisfied the following criteria.

The place is important in demonstrating the course, or pattern, of cultural or natural history in New South Wales.

Of historical significance for its associations with the maritime activities at Manly as a tourist destination and suburb of Sydney, dependent on the ferry link to the Sydney CBD.

The place is important in demonstrating aesthetic characteristics and/or a high degree of creative or technical achievement in New South Wales.

Of environmental significance as a visually prominent manmade feature.

The place has strong or special association with a particular community or cultural group in New South Wales for social, cultural or spiritual reasons.

Of social significance as the ferry link to Sydney CBD by commuters and visitors.

See also

Manly Cove Pavilion

References

Bibliography

Attribution

External links

 Manly Wharf at Transport for New South Wales (Archived 12 June 2019)
Manly Wharf Public Transport Map Transport for NSW

Ferry wharves in Sydney
New South Wales State Heritage Register
Manly, New South Wales
Parks in New South Wales
Water transport in New South Wales
Wharves in Australia
Articles incorporating text from the New South Wales State Heritage Register